Castilleja angustifolia (synonym: Castilleja chromosa) is a species of wildflower known by the common names northwestern Indian paintbrush and desert Indian paintbrush.  It is an herbaceous perennial native to the desert, scrublands, and woodlands of western North America. It grows in hot sandy soils and rock crevices in dry conditions.

Description

This Indian paintbrush is under half a meter in height and has bristly gray-green to purple-red herbage. It stands in a clump of erect stems, each topped with an inflorescence of somewhat tubular yellow green flowers. The flowers are encased in bright red to orange-red bracts, sometimes tinted with purple, and usually fuzzy with a thin coat of white hairs. The upper leaves and bracts are divided into 3–5 segments, while the lower leaves are undivided, long, and narrow.

The plant flowers from May to September. In areas such as Idaho, Montana and Wyoming, it is often associated with sagebrush. The brightly colored bracts are used to attach pollinators like hummingbirds and butterflies that would otherwise ignore the plant's small yellow green flowers. The centimeter-long capsule fruits contain honeycomb-patterned seeds.

The species is similar to Castilleja linariaefolia.

References

External links

angustifolia
Flora of the Western United States
North American desert flora
Flora of the California desert regions
Flora of the Great Basin
Flora of Arizona
Flora of California
Flora of Colorado
Flora of Idaho
Flora of Montana
Flora of New Mexico
Flora of Nevada
Flora of Oregon
Flora of South Dakota
Flora of Utah
Flora of Washington (state)
Flora of Wyoming
Natural history of the Mojave Desert
Taxa named by Thomas Nuttall
Flora without expected TNC conservation status